Shiloh Gloyn (born 6 November 1989) is a New Zealand field hockey player and has played over 50 tests for the New Zealand national team.

She participated at the 2018 Women's Hockey World Cup held in London and was a member of the New Zealand hockey squad which won gold at the Gold Coast 2018 Commonwealth Games.

References

1989 births
Living people
New Zealand female field hockey players
Female field hockey midfielders
Sportspeople from Taupō
Field hockey players at the 2018 Commonwealth Games
Commonwealth Games medallists in field hockey
Commonwealth Games gold medallists for New Zealand
20th-century New Zealand women
21st-century New Zealand women
Medallists at the 2018 Commonwealth Games